Henry De Gruchy (15 May 1898 – 2 May 1952) was an Australian cricketer. He played one first-class cricket match for Victoria in 1924. He was a batting all-rounder, regarded as a useful change bowler but not a wicket taker.

In district cricket he played for Carlton, first representing the club in the Metropolitan League when he was just eleven and he was a regular in the district team from the 1917-18 season. In 1924 he was selected as captain of a Victorian youth side which played against a South Australian youth side, and in February 1924 he represented Victoria in a first-class game against Tasmania. His Carlton career lasted twenty years, during which he often opening the batting with Bill Woodfull, and he became a life member of the club. He also played baseball for Carlton and Victoria.

See also
 List of Victoria first-class cricketers

References

External links
 

1898 births
1952 deaths
Australian cricketers
Victoria cricketers
Cricketers from Sydney